, sometimes spelled Hitosi, was a Japanese chemist specializing in the field of organic chemistry, known as the head of Japanese organic chemistry research, and one of the discoverers of Nozaki–Hiyama–Kishi reaction. He was Emeritus Professor of Kyoto University.

Life
Nozaki was born in Okayama, Japan, in 1922. He received his BS and PhD degree, respectively, from the Kyoto Imperial University.

Contributions
In Japan, Hitoshi Nozaki was one of the leaders of the organic chemistry academic circles during the period of Japanese post-war economic miracle.

Terpene-based synthetic of carboxylic cation
Nozaki–Hiyama–Kishi reaction

Notable students
Ryoji Noyori: 2001 Nobel Prize in Chemistry winner.
Yoshito Kishi: Professor at Harvard University.

Recognition
1979 Chemistry Society of Japan(CSJ) Award
1986 Japan Academy Prize
1986 Medal with Purple Ribbon
1992 Order of the Sacred Treasure
1993 Special Award in Synthetic Organic Chemistry, Japan
1999 Member of Japan Academy

References

External links 
 野崎 一 Hitoshi Nozaki | Chem-Station (ケムステ)

1922 births
2019 deaths
Academic staff of Kyoto University
Japanese chemists
People from Okayama
Kyoto University alumni